Chris Maas is an American canoe sailor.

Maas became the 2008 World Champion in the development canoes event by finishing in front of fellow Americans Steve Clark and Oliver Moore.

Career highlights 

 2008
 Port Phillip Bay,  1st, World Championships Canoe Sailing, Development Canoe

References

Living people
American male sailors (sport)
American male canoeists
Year of birth missing (living people)